Anoplognathus olivieri is a species of beetle within the genus Anoplognathus.

Description
Anoplognathus olivieri is distinguished by laterally expanded female elytra, smooth mostly impunctate ventrites and shiny pygidium with apical tuft of setae

References

Insects described in 1817
Scarabaeidae
Insects of Australia